Arihant is a  jiva (soul) who has conquered inner passions such as attachment, anger, pride and greed. Having destroyed four inimical karmas, they realize pure self. Arihants are also called kevalins (omniscient beings) as they possess kevala jnana (pure infinite knowledge). An arihant is also called a jina ("victor"). At the end of their life, arihants destroy remaining karmas and attain moksha (liberation) and become siddhas. Arihantas have a body while siddhas are bodiless pure spirit. The Ṇamōkāra mantra, the fundamental prayer dedicated to Pañca-Parameṣṭhi (five supreme beings), begins with Ṇamō arihantāṇaṁ, "obeisance to the arihants".

Kevalins - omniscient beings - are said to be of two kinds
 Tirthankara kevalī:  24 human spiritual guides who after attaining omniscience teach the path to salvation.
 Sāmānya kevalī: Kevalins who are concerned with their own liberation.

According to Jains, every soul has the potential to become an arihant. A soul which destroys all kashayas or inner enemies like anger, ego, deception, and greed, responsible for the perpetuation of ignorance, becomes an arihant.

Philosophy 
According to Jain texts, omniscience is attained on the destruction of four types of karmas– deluding, the knowledge-obscuring, the perception-obscuring and the obstructive karmas, in the order mentioned. The arihants are said to be free from the following eighteen imperfections:

 janma – (re)birth;
 jarā – old-age;
 triśā – thirst;
 kśudhā – hunger;
 vismaya – astonishment;
 arati – displeasure;
 kheda – regret;
 roga – sickness;
 śoka – grief;
 mada – pride;
 moha – delusion;
 bhaya – fear;
 nidrā – sleep;
 cintā – anxiety;
 sveda – perspiration;
 rāga – attachment;
 dveśa – aversion; and
 maraņa – death.

Omniscience 

In Jainism, omniscience is said to be the infinite, all-embracing knowledge that reflects, as it were in a mirror, all substances and their infinite modes, extending through the past, the present and the future. According to Jain texts, omniscience is the natural attribute of the pure souls. The self-attaining omniscience becomes a kevalin.

The four infinitudes (ananta cātuṣṭaya) are: 
 ananta jñāna, infinite knowledge
 ananta darśana, perfect perception due to the destruction of all darśanāvaraṇīya karmas
 ananta sukha, infinite bliss
 ananta vīrya – infinite energy

Tirthankaras 

Those arihants who re-establish the Jain faith are called tirthankaras. Tirthankaras revitalize the sangha, the fourfold order consisting of male saints (sādhus), female saints (sādhvis), male householders (śrāvaka) and female householders (srāvika).

The first tirthankara of the current time cycle was Ṛṣabhanātha, and the twenty-fourth and last Tirthankara was Mahavira, who lived from 599 BCE to 527 BCE.

Jain texts mention forty-six attributes of arihants or tirthankaras. These attributes comprise four infinitudes (ananta chatushtaya), thirty-four miraculous happenings (atiśaya), and eight splendours (prātihārya).

The eight splendours (prātihārya) are:
 aśokavrikśa – the Ashoka tree;
  siṃhāsana– bejeweled throne;
  chatra – three-tier canopy;
  bhāmadal – halo of unmatched luminance;
  divya dhvani – divine voice of the Lord without lip movement;
  puśpavarśā – shower of fragrant flowers;
  camara – waving of sixty-four majestic hand-fans; and
  dundubhi – dulcet sound of kettle-drums and other musical instruments.

Liberation 
At the time of nirvana (final release), the arihant sheds off the remaining four aghati karmas:
 Nama (physical structure forming) karma
 Gotra (status forming) karma,
 Vedniya (pain and pleasure causing) karma,
 Ayushya (life span determining) karma.

These four karmas do not affect the true nature of the soul and are therefore called aghati karmas.

Worship 

In the Ṇamōkāra mantra, Namo Arihantanam, Namo Siddhanam, Jains worship the arihants first and then to the siddhas, even though the latter are perfected souls who have destroyed all karmas but arihants are considered to be at a higher spiritual stage than siddhas. Since siddhas have attained ultimate liberation, they probably are not directly accessible but may be through the wisdom they passed on. However arihants are accessible for spiritual guidance of human society until their nirvana. The Dravyasaṃgraha, a major Jain text, states:

See also
God in Jainism
Śramaṇa
Simandhar Swami
Jainism and non-creationism
Jain philosophy

Notes

References

External links 

Jain philosophical concepts
Jain saints